In baseball statistics, hits per nine innings (denoted by H/9) is the average number of hits allowed by a pitcher in a nine inning period; calculated as: (hits allowed x 9) / innings pitched.  This is a measure of a pitcher's success based on the number of all outs he records.

Compared to a pitcher's batting average against, a pitcher's H/9 benefits from sacrifice bunts, double plays, runners caught stealing, and outfield assist, but it is hurt by some errors. Unlike batting average against, a pitcher's H/9 benefits from outs that are not related to official at bats, as they are recorded on runners after they have reached base.

, Nolan Ryan is the career leader (6.5553), Sandy Koufax is #2 (6.7916), Clayton Kershaw is #3 (6.8160).

See also
Walks plus hits per inning pitched (WHIP)

References

Pitching statistics